László Szőke (17 October 1930 – 19 March 2014) was a Hungarian footballer.

Career
Szőke was born in Budapest. In 1949 he moved to Italy under contract to Fanfulla before becoming a well-known name in Italian football by being transferred to first division Udinese who went on to place themselves in second position, behind the great AC Milan, in the Serie A division during the 1955–56 season.

Szőke had a spell in Colombia with Atlético Junior during the 1951 season.

Subsequently he transferred to Triestina and with them he won the Italian serie B championship in 1957/58.

At the end of the 1960 season he was ceded to Brescia, coached at the time by another Hungarian born personage in György Sárosi, only to return to Trieste at the end of that season. With the Triestina team, now in Serie B, he became one of the squad's focal points, winning the 1961/62 premiership, returning immediately to Serie B where he ended his playing days in 1963 after suffering a serious leg injury.

He remained in the Udine area, and died in hospital in that city on 19 March 2014, at the age of 83.

References

1930 births
2014 deaths
Hungarian footballers
Udinese Calcio players
U.S. Triestina Calcio 1918 players
Brescia Calcio players
Serie A players
Serie B players
Expatriate footballers in Italy
Atlético Junior footballers
Categoría Primera A players
Hungarian expatriate sportspeople in France
Hungarian expatriate sportspeople in Colombia
Hungarian expatriate sportspeople in Italy
Expatriate footballers in Colombia
Racing Club de France Football players
Ligue 1 players
Expatriate footballers in France
Hungarian expatriate footballers
Association football midfielders
Footballers from Budapest